Cheshunt Football Club is a football club based in Cheshunt, Hertfordshire, England.

History

Original club

The original Cheshunt Football Club was formed around 1880 and played in black and white stripes. The first recorded game was in 1888, winning 4–0 against Novocastrians. They won the first Herts Charity Cup in 1900–01 and went on to win it again in 1903–04 and 1905–06. They also reached the FA Amateur Cup semi-final in 1903–04, losing 2–0 to Ealing.

After leaving the Football Association in 1907 to join the AFA, they then became founder members of the Southern Amateur League in the same year and competed in Section B until World War I, They joined the Athenian league in 1919–20, leaving and rejoining the Southern Amateur in 1920–21 where they won Section B, before rejoining the Athenian league in 1921–22. They won the Herts Senior Cup in 1923–24 beating Hoddesdon Town 3–0 in the final. After their best league position of fifth in 1926–27, Cheshunt's form collapsed and they finished bottom of the Athenian league for the next four seasons. Heavily in debt, they disbanded in 1931 after their landlords, Cheshunt Cricket Club, raised the rent on their Albury Ride ground.

Modern club
The modern club was established in July 1946 at a public meeting in the Co-op Hall in Waltham Cross. A group of local businessmen decided to form a new club for the town, and local junior team Crossbrook Sports were used as the basis for the new club, retaining their amber and black kit. They immediately applied and were accepted into the London League, playing in Division One for the 1946–47 season. They finished runners-up (recording their biggest-ever win, 11–0 at Royal Ordnance Factory, in the process) and won the League Cup and Herts Charity Shield.

Cheshunt won Division One in 1947–48 but remained in the same division. They won it again in 1948–49, earning promotion to the Premier Division, and reached the Herts Senior Cup final for the first time. The following season they won the Premier Division, beating Tilbury on the last day of the season to clinch the title from them. They also reached the third round of the Amateur Cup following a run that included defeating holders Bromley in front of a record crowd of 5,000.

During the 1950s the club changed leagues several times; they were members of the Delphian League between 1951–52 and 1954–55, rejoined the London League in 1955 and then left to become founder members of the Aetolian League in 1959. In 1957–58 they reached the FA Cup fourth qualifying round for the first time.

Cheshunt joined the Spartan League for the 1962–63 season and won the title at the first attempt. The following season they won the Spartan League Cup, before joining Division Two of the Athenian League in 1964. They finished runners-up in their second season under the management of Terry Medwin, the former Welsh international, and were promoted to Division One, also winning the Herts Charity Shield. The Division One title was won in 1967–68, beating Wembley in a head-to-head championship decider, to earn promotion to the Premier Division.

They won the Mithras Cup in 1969–70, the London Charity Cup in 1973–74, the Athenian League Cup and East Anglian Cup in 1974–75 and the Athenian League Cup again in 1975–76. They also reached four Herts Senior Cup finals, two Mithras Cup finals as well as solitary East Anglian Cup and Herts Charity Cup finals during the 1970s. Between 1975 and 1995, the club had yellow and blue as its club colours, reverting to amber and black afterwards.

After several failed attempts, Cheshunt joined Division Two of the Isthmian League in 1977. In 1981–82 they finished second, and were promoted to Division One, but were relegated two seasons later. At the start of the 1986–87 season a mass walkout of Committee, management and players – due to budget cuts and demands to see a first team made up of former youth team players – led to Cheshunt finishing bottom of Division Two and being relegated into the Spartan League.

In 1992–93 Cheshunt won the Spartan League Cup and finished third in the league, earning promotion back to Division Three of the Isthmian League. They finished second in their first season and were promoted to Division Two, but were relegated at the end of the 1997–98 season. However, they made an immediate return to Division Two after finishing third. In 2002–03 they won the division, and were promoted to Division One. A third-place finish the following year saw them promoted to the Premier Division. At the end of the season the club finished in the relegation zone, but avoided being demoted after Hornchurch went bust. Instead, the club were transferred to the Southern League Premier Division. In 2007–08 they were relegated, and were placed in Division One North of the Isthmian League. In 2016–17 the club won the Herts Charity Cup for the third time.

League reorganisation saw Cheshunt placed in the South Central Division for the 2018–19 season. After a third-place finish, the club third in the division, qualifying for the promotion play-offs. They defeated Marlow 2–1 in the semi-finals and Bracknell Town 3–0 in the final to secure promotion back to the Premier Division. After finishing fifth position in 2021–22, Cheshunt went on to win the promotion play-offs, defeating Hornchurch 2–1 in final, earning promotion to the National League South.

Stadium

The original Cheshunt Football Club played at the Recreation Ground on Albury Ride, a ground owned by Cheshunt Cricket Club.

The modern club initially played at the Gothic sports ground, before moving to College Road for their second season. In 1949 they moved to the Cheshunt Stadium on Theobalds Lane. Originally a gravel pit, by the 1930s the site had become the local rubbish tip, but between February and October 1949, it was cleared, levelled and a pitch was laid. Two Nissen huts were assembled, where the main gates are today, for changing rooms (with no power, telephone line or hot water), leaving the players with a long walk uphill to the pitch. The ground was opened on 29 October 1949, with the club recording their record home win (11–1 against Hastings United) in the ground's first fixture.

Drainage problems forced the club to abandon the stadium before the 1949–50 season had ended and move to a new ground on Brookfield Lane. However, they returned to the Cheshunt Stadium in 1952–53 but again left after a season, due to the poor playing surface, to return to Brookfield Lane though this time as the tenants of Tottenham Hotspur, who were using it as their training ground. At the end of the 1957–58 season Cheshunt were asked to leave and so returned to the Cheshunt Stadium. Chairman Les Noble and vice-chair Frank Davis moved quickly to secure a 21-year lease on the stadium (which was about to be used by a new club, Waltham Cross FC) and spent £2,500 getting bulldozers in to level space for the present stand and Clubhouse (then the changing rooms too) to be built and clearing the banking to make way for a running track around the pitch (which was removed in the 1980s).

The clubhouse and pitch were ready for the opening game of the 1957–58 season against Wingate. A year later the main stand was built by the groundsman Albert Prior, his son Maurice and chairman Frank Davis in their spare time. It held 400 spectators on bench seats and had a door in the centre to the changing rooms. A covered terrace was built on the other side of the pitch in 1963, although located 20 yards back from the pitch. Floodlights came in 1964, the current function hall three years later. In 1977 the current changing rooms were built, enabling the conversion of the old changing rooms to the clubhouse. In 1982 proper seating was installed for the first time, with the oak seats in the directors box were taken from White Hart Lane's old west stand (which was being demolished) and the plywood seating to the north end of the stand was taken from the relatively new north-west corner of White Hart Lane. 

In the 2002–03 season, the section of terracing south of the main stand was covered and named in honour of defender Kurtis Townsend, son of then manager Troy Townsend, who had died whilst travelling to an away game the previous season and seats originally from the East Stand at Stamford Bridge were installed on the covered terrace. The main stand, the Kurtis Townsend stand and the floodlights were all replaced in the summer of 2015. A new main stand seating 250 was built on the halfway line closer to the touchline while two small covered standing areas were positioned behind each goal.

Current squad

Dual-registration

Management and support staff

Directors

Honours
Isthmian League
Division Two champions 2002–03
Athenian League
Division One champions 1967–68, 1975–76
Challenge Cup winners 1974–75, 1975–76
Spartan League
Champions 1962–63
Challenge Cup winners 1963–64, 1992–93
London League
Premier Division champions 1949–50
Division One champions, 1947–48, 1948–49
Division One Cup winners 1946–47
Southern Amateur League
Section B champions 1920–21
London Charity Cup
Winners 1973–74
East Anglian Cup
Winners 1974–75
Herts Charity Cup
Winners 2005–06, 2007–08, 2016–17
Herts Charity Shield
Winners 1946–47, 1965–66
Herts Senior Cup
Winners 2021–22

Records
Best FA Cup performance: Fourth qualifying round, 1925–26, 1958–59, 1966–67, 1970–71, 1977–78
Best FA Amateur Cup performance: Semi-finals, 1903–04
Best FA Trophy performance: Fifth round, 2021–22
Best FA Vase performance: Quarter-finals, 1981–82
Record attendance: 5,000 vs Bromley, FA Amateur Cup second round, 28 January 1950
Heaviest defeat: 10–0 vs Eton Manor, London League, 17 April 1956
Most appearances: John Poole, 512 (1970–1976, 1979–1983)
Most goals: Darrell Cox, 152 (1997–2005, 2007–2008 & 2010)
Record transfer fee received: £10,000 from Peterborough United for Lloyd Opara, 2006

See also
Cheshunt F.C. players
Cheshunt F.C. managers

Notes

References

External links

Official website

 
Football clubs in England
Football clubs in Hertfordshire
1880 establishments in England
1931 disestablishments in England
1946 establishments in England
Association football clubs established in 1880
Association football clubs disestablished in 1931
Association football clubs established in 1946
Southern Amateur Football League
Athenian League
London League (football)
Delphian League
Aetolian League (football)
Spartan League
Isthmian League
Southern Football League clubs
Cheshunt
National League (English football) clubs